Tatabánya Kézilabda Club is a Hungarian team handball club from Tatabánya, that plays in the Nemzeti Bajnokság I.

The current name of the club is MOL-Tatabánya KC due to sponsorship reasons.

History

In Tatabánya, handball boasts a long history. The game took place in an organized form from 1942, within the framework of the Tatabányai Bányász Sport Club (TBSC). The transition from the big field to the small field handball, which was ordered by the Hungarian Handball Association (MKSZ) at the end of 1959, was a fundamental change. Tatabánya could start its new role in the Western Group of NB II. In 1966, TBSC became the champion in the Western Group of NB II, allowing him to start at the forefront. The members of the NB II champion team included Alfréd Antalóczy, Vilmos Drobnits and Sándor Kaló. At the end of the season, with only a worse goal difference, they were eliminated from Nemzeti Bajnokság I. Sándor Kaló became the top scorer with 160 goals. The association (MKSZ) first announced the single-group NB I/B championship in 1968, which was won by the TBSC with a great advantage and was able to be included in Nemzeti Bajnokság I again. From here, the "golden age" of the Tatabánya KC team lasted more than twenty years. In 1969, TBSC made history in Hungarian handball, as it was the first rural team to win the Hungarian Cup. The members of the cup winning team: László Szabó, Ferenc Sándor (goalkeepers), Sándor Kaló, Lajos Simó, László Katona, Ernő Bakonyi, Tibor Bognár, László Fekete, Antal Schalkhammer, Imre Molnár, Alfréd Antalóczy, László Vörös. In 1974, Tatabánya KC became the first small-scale champion in the history of Hungarian men's handball, breaking the hegemony of the capital. The members of the championship team: László Szabó, Ferenc Sándor (goalkeepers), Ernő Gubányi, László Katona, Lajos Simó, Sándor Kaló, László Fekete, Pál Pavelka, Lajos Mészáros, József Bognár, Mihály Hegedűs, Ottó Szigeti, Ernő Bakonyi, Jenő Flasch. In 1978, Tatabánya KC became the champion for the second time and also won the Hungarian Cup for the second time. The members of the team: Béla Bartalos, László Szabó (goalkeepers), Sándor Kaló, József Bognár, Gyula Básti, László Katona, Lajos Mészáros, Ernő Gubányi, Jenő Flasch, Árpád Pál, Lajos Pánovics, Zsolt Kontra, József Hernicz, László Bábos. The club won the championship twice more: in 1979 and 1984. Members of the 1984 championship team: László Hoffmann, Lajos Vincze (goalkeepers), László Bábos, József Bognár, Gyula Básti, Jenő Flasch, Tamás Füredi, Ferenc Füzesi, Ernő Gubányi, Antal Kanyó, Zsolt Kontra, László Marosi, Antal Nagy, Árpád Pál, Jakab Sibalin, István Wohner. The fact of the redevelopment or closure of the Tatabánya Coal Mines was felt in 1990: salaries and other benefits became more and more limited. László Marosi, the six-time goal king of TBSC, has been certified for the German Bundesliga team, TBV Lemgo. The following year, the staffing of the team underwent a huge change. Nine key players left and still could not retain their place in the top class. The Tatabánya KC presidency gave the team one year under similar conditions to return to Nemzeti Bajnokság I. The team took the opportunity to win the 1992/93 NB I/B Championship unbeaten in their group and were at the forefront again. The team commuted up and down for a while between the first and second divisions. In 2001, László Marosi, a world-class handball player, became the managing director of Tatabánya KC. This team returned to Nemzeti Bajnokság I in 2002. In the 2009/10 season, the team won a bronze medal in the league after many years. In his ranks with players such as Ivo Díaz, Gyula Gál, Gergely Harsányi, Máté Halász, Gábor Szente.

Crest, colours, supporters

Naming history

Club crest

Kit manufacturers and shirt sponsor

The following table shows in detail MOL-Tatabánya Kézilabda Club kit manufacturers and shirt sponsors by year:

Kits

Sports Hall information

Name: – Tatabányai Multifunkcionális Sportcsarnok
City: – Tatabánya
Capacity: – 6200
Address: – 2800 Tatabánya, Olimpikon u.

Management

Team

Current squad 

Squad for the 2022–23 season

Technical staff
 Head coach:  Csaba Tombor
 Assistant coach:  Jakab Sibalin
 Goalkeeping coach:  Haris Porobic
 Fitness coach:  László Elek
 Physiotherapist:  Róbert Radnai
 Physiotherapist:  Mónika Kemény
 Masseur:  Jenő Flasch
 Masseur:  Gyula Kovács
 Club doctor:  Dr. Zoltán Csőkör

Transfers

Transfers for the 2023–24 season

Joining 
  Fran Mileta (RW) from  RK Nexe Našice
  Huba Vajda (LP) from  Balatonfüredi KSE
  Márkó Eklemovic (CB) from  BFKA-Veszprém

Leaving

Previous squads

Top scorers

Retired numbers

Honours

Individual awards
 Double
 Winners (1): 1977–78

Domestic
Nemzeti Bajnokság I Top Scorer

Recent seasons

Seasons in Nemzeti Bajnokság I: 50
Seasons in Nemzeti Bajnokság I/B: 6
Seasons in Nemzeti Bajnokság II: 7

European competition

EHF Cup Winners' Cup: from the 2012–13 season, the men's competition was merged with the EHF Cup.EHF Cup: It was formerly known as the IHF Cup until 1993. Also, starting from the 2012–13 season the competition has been merged with the EHF Cup Winners' Cup. The competition will be known as the EHF European League from the 2020–21 season.

European record
As of 30 September 2021:

Statistics: matches played: 106 – wins: 50 – draws: 10 – losses: 46 – goals scored: 2,806 – goals conceded: 2,757

Overall results by opponent and country

EHF ranking

Former club members

Notable former players

 Gábor Ancsin (2019–)
 Zsolt Balogh (2019–2022)
 Béla Bartalos (1978–1981)
 Donát Bartók (2013–2015)
 László Bartucz (2011–2013, 2018–2022)
 Imre Bíró (1985–1989)
 Richárd Bodó (2011–2016)
 Ádám Borbély (2015–2016, 2019–2020)
 Attila Borsos (1986–1988, 1990–1991, 2002–2003)
 Viktor Debre (1985–1990)
 János Dénes (2009–2020)
 Ivo Díaz (2009–2016)
 Ákos Doros (2005–2006)
 Dávid Fekete (2022)
 Botond Ferenczi (2008–2009)
 Ferenc Füzesi (1982–1985)
 Gyula Gál (2009, 2012)
 Ernő Gubányi
 Mátyás Győri (2018–)
 Máté Halász (2005–2011)
 Gergely Harsányi (2010–2018)
 László Hoffmann
 Péter Hornyák (2019–2022)
 Ferenc Ilyés (2016–2021)
 Mihály Iváncsik (1999–2000)
 Tamás Iváncsik (2003–2006)
 Ádám Juhász (2012–2022)
 Sándor Kaló
 Antal Kanyó
 Dávid Katzirz (2004–2005, 2013–2016)
  Marinko Kekezović (2010–2011)
 István Kiss
 Zsolt Kontra (1976–1986)
  Milorad Krivokapić (2013–2014)
 Rudolf Kubasi
 Norbert Kuzma
 Csaba Leimeter (2016–2017)
 Ákos Lele (2010–2013, 2015–2016)
 Szilveszter Liszkai
 László Marosi (1981–1990)
 Árpád Mohácsi
 Bence Nagy (2019)
 Árpád Pál (1976–1984, 1987)
 Ákos Pásztor (2011–2020)
 Pedro Rodríguez Álvarez (2022–)
 István Rédei (2011–2012)
 István Rosta
 Miklós Rosta (2015–2019)
 Ákos Sándor
 Jakab Sibalin
 Lajos Simó
 Adrián Sipos (2016–2021)
 Stefan Sunajko (2020–2022)
 János Szathmári (2003–2005)
 András Szász
 Gábor Szente
 Márton Székely (2016–2019, 2022–)
 Balázs Szögi
 Balázs Szöllősi
 Szabolcs Szöllősi (2015–2018)
 István Szotyori
 Petar Topic (2022–)
  Mihály Tóth
 Szabolcs Törő
 Dávid Ubornyák (2022–)
 Uroš Vilovski (2022–)
 Norbert Visy
 Bence Zdolik (2020–2022)
 György Zsigmond
 Bruno Civelli
 Damir Djukic (2013–2014)
 Josip Perić (2014–2015, 2022–)
 Vladimir Vranješ (2016–2020)
 Aliaksei Ushal (2021–2022)
 Alencar Cassiano Rossoni
 Igor Kos
 Mateo Maraš (2022–)
 Mislav Nenadić
 Jakov Vranković (2017–2019)
 Mohsen Babasafari
 Alireza Mousavi (2014–2015)
 Filip Lazarov
 Miloš Božović (2016–2021)
 Rade Mijatović (2015–2016)
 Miloš Vujović (2015–2020)
  Žarko Marković
 Piotr Wyszomirski (2020–2022)
 Viorel Fotache (2021–2022)
 Demis Grigoraș (2016–2019)
 Ionuț Iancu (2017–2018)
 Vitaly Komogorov (2019–2020)
 Cristian Ugalde (2022–)
 Nikola Crnoglavac (2015–2016)
 Uros Borzas (2019–2020)
 Novak Bošković (2014–2015)
 Marko Krsmančić (2015–2016)
 Nemanja Obradović (2022–)
 Darko Pavlović
 Nenad Savić
 Michal Martin Konečný (2020–2021)
 Martin Mazak
 Michal Meluš
 Teodor Paul (2013–2015)
 Lukáš Urban (2021–2022)
 Tomáš Urban (2009–2011, 2012)

Former coaches

References

External links
  
 Grundfos Tatabánya KC at EHF 
 

 
Hungarian handball clubs
Handball clubs established in 1942
Tatabánya